Sixteen Tons Entertainment is a German computer game developer company based in Tübingen and Berlin, which emerged from the brand label of the Tübingen game developer Promotion Software. The company was founded in 1993 by Ralph Stock. Sixteen Tons Entertainment became known through the Emergency series and Mad TV.

History 
Sixteen Tons Entertainment was originally a brand label of the Tübingen company Promotion Software. In the 1990s, advertising adventures were developed in the studio, as well as indirect successors to the strategy game Mad TV (Caribbean Disaster , Mad News) and Hurra Germany, a game for the 1994 federal election.

In 1998, Emergency was released, the first in a series of real-time strategy games. Further successors to the game series followed until 2017, for the PC and mobile platforms. In 2018, Emergency HQ, the first free-to-play game for the series, was released.

Between 2004 and 2009 board game conversions to games by Reiner Knizia (Keltis , Simply Genial) and educational software for children to the Willi-wills-wissen television series followed.

In 2009 a second studio was founded in Babelsberg near Potsdam . The Potsdam studio moved to Berlin in 2017.

On January 15, 2020, it was announced that Sixteen Tons Entertainment was taken over by Phoenix Games. Founder Ralph Stock will remain managing director of the company.

Development Studios 
 Sixteen Tons Studio Tübingen, Gründungsstudio
 Sixteen Tons Studio Berlin (formed in 2009)

Games 
 Emergency series:
 Emergency: Fighters for Life
 Emergency 2: The Ultimate Fight for Life
 Emergency 3: Mission Life
 Emergency 4: Global Fighters for Life
 Emergency 5
 Emergency Police
 Emergency 2012: Die Welt am Abgrund
 Emergency 2013
 Emergency 2014
 Emergency 2016
 Emergency 2017
 Emergency 20
 Emergency DS
 Emergency HQ
 Caribbean Disaster
 Hurra Deutschland
 Mad News
 Mad News – Extrablatt
 Mad TV
 Der Stein der Weisen
 The Show (2007)
 Ben Hur Live – Das legendäre Wagenrennen
 Einfach Genial 2.0
 Keltis: Der Weg der Steine
 Gotcha! Extreme Paintball
 Willi wills wissen series:
 Willi wills wissen: Feuerwehr im Einsatz
 Willi wills wissen: Notruf Retter im Einsatz
 Willi wills wissen: SOS – Rettung auf See
 Willi wills wissen: Bei den Wikingern
 Willi und die Wunder dieser Welt – Expedition 1: Megacity & Dschungel
 Willi und die Wunder dieser Welt – Expedition 2: Arktis & Wüste

References

External links 
 Official Website
 Sixteen Tons Entertainment at MobyGames

1993 establishments in Germany
German companies established in 1993
Companies based in Berlin
German brands
Software companies of Germany
Software companies established in 1993
Video game companies established in 1993
Video game companies of Germany
Video game development companies